The Bank of the Southwest Tower was a proposed building located in Houston, Texas, at 1,404 ft tall. It would have been the second tallest building in North America after the Willis Tower in Chicago. With an estimated construction cost of $350–400 million, the project was cancelled before construction commenced, due to lack of funds during the economic downturn. 

The design created by architect Helmut Jahn of Murphy/Jahn, Inc. Architects was the winner of a design competition in 1982.

References

Further reading

External links
 Bank of the Southwest Tower at SkyscraperPage's Forums
 1982 New York Times Article

 

Unbuilt buildings and structures in the United States
Skyscrapers in Houston